Arnica unalaschcensis is an Asian and North American species of flowering plant in the family Asteraceae, known as Alaskan arnica. It is found on both sides of the Bering Strait, being native to Alaska, the Pacific Coast of Russia, and northern Japan. Its habitats include coastal tundra and alpine slopes.

Varieties
 Arnica unalaschcensis var. unalaschcensis 
 Arnica unalaschcensis var. tschonoskyi (Iljin) Kitam. & H.Hara

References

External links

unalaschcensis
Flora of Alaska
Flora of Eastern Asia
Flora of the Russian Far East
Plants described in 1831
Flora without expected TNC conservation status